Tim Craft (born February 3, 1977) is an American basketball coach.  He is head men's basketball coach at Gardner–Webb University. He was formerly an assistant coach for East Carolina University and Auburn University.

Head coaching record

Early career
While completing his undergraduate degree at the University of Florida, Craft served as a student manager for the Gators baseball team under Head Coach Andy Lopez.

References

External links
 Gardner–Webb profile

1978 births
Living people
Basketball coaches from Florida
Auburn Tigers men's basketball coaches
College men's basketball head coaches in the United States
East Carolina Pirates men's basketball coaches
Gardner–Webb Runnin' Bulldogs men's basketball coaches
High school basketball coaches in Florida
Pensacola State Pirates men's basketball coaches
University of Florida alumni